Yaka may refer to the following languages of Africa:
 Yaka language (Congo–Angola), the most populous, spoken in Angola and the Democratic Republic of the Congo ( on the map)
 One of the other Yaka languages
 Yaka language (Kivu), a minor language on the north shore of Lake Kivu, in the east of the Democratic Republic of the Congo ( on the map)
 Yaka language (Lékoumou), in the Lékoumou department of the Republic of the Congo ( on the map)
 Yaka language (Ubangi), or Aka, spoken along the Ubangi River between the Republic of the Congo and the Central African Republic ( on the map)
 Yaka language (Cameroon), spoken in Cameroon, the Republic of the Congo and the Central Africa Republic ( on the map)

See also 
 Yakkha language, spoken in Nepal and India
 Yakan language, spoken in the Philippines